Marcelo Ramos (born December 27, 1972 in Montevideo, Uruguay) is a former Uruguayan footballer who played for clubs of Uruguay and Chile.

Teams
  Progreso 1992–1994
  Villa Española 1995–1996
  Liverpool 1997–1998
  Unión San Felipe 1999
  Deportes Linares 2000
  Racing 2001
  River Plate 2002
  Salto 2003

External links
 Profile at Tenfield Digital Profile at

1972 births
Living people
Uruguayan footballers
Uruguayan expatriate footballers
C.A. Progreso players
Villa Española players
Club Atlético River Plate (Montevideo) players
Racing Club de Montevideo players
Liverpool F.C. (Montevideo) players
Deportes Linares footballers
Unión San Felipe footballers
Primera B de Chile players
Expatriate footballers in Chile
Association footballers not categorized by position